Heosphora leuconeura is a moth in the family Pyralidae. The species was first described by Alfred Jefferis Turner in 1913, as Poujadia leuconeura from a specimen collected in Darwin in the month of March. The species epithet, leuconeura, describes the moth as being "white-nerved". It is found in Australia.

References 

Moths described in 1913
Moths of Australia
Taxa named by Alfred Jefferis Turner